Mowr-e Gur (also romanized as Mowr-e Gūr; also known as Mūr-e Kūr) is a village in Jowzam Rural District, Dehaj District, Shahr-e Babak County, Kerman Province, Iran. At the 2006 census, its population was 23, in 5 families.

References 

Populated places in Shahr-e Babak County